El Bradâa is a town and commune in the Mahdia Governorate, Tunisia. As of 2004 it had a population of 6,416.

See also
List of cities in Tunisia

References

Populated places in Mahdia Governorate
Communes of Tunisia